Ram guards protect the hydraulic ram on an excavator which is used to move the boom and other parts of the arm of an excavator to carry out work.

Ram guards are best suited and successfully used for machines used for demolition and civil engineering purposes, and can be fitted to most excavators.  They prevent the ram from over-extending and provides an additional safeguard when the excavator is in use.

Hydraulics